Okuku  is a town in  Cross River State, Nigeria. It is one of the major towns in Yala Local Government Area. There is a strategic grain silo in Okuku, and the College of Medical Sciences of the Cross River State University of Technology (CRUTECH) is also located there. Both were commissioned by former deputy governor Chief Dr. Matthias Oko Offoboche between 1979 and 1983.

See also
Cross River State
Yala, Nigeria

References

External links
Cross River State of Nigeria website
Maplandia.com - google maps world gazetteer

Populated places in Cross River State